Dasht-e Gur, also rendered as Dasht-e Kuror Dasht-e Kowr, may refer to:
 Dasht-e Gur, Bushehr
 Dasht-e Gur, Fars